PDZ  may refer to:

Panzer Dragoon II Zwei, a video game released for the Sega Saturn in 1996
Perfect Dark Zero, a video game released for the Xbox 360 in 2005
PDZ domain, a protein domain